Alemayehu or ˁAlämayyähu (Ge'ez: አለማየሁ) is a personal name of Ethiopian origin which is composed of two words: "Alem"- meaning "the world or life" and "ayehu" - means "I have seen". Its literal meaning is "I have seen the world" . However, in the context of personal name, its actual meaning is "I have enjoyed life" in the Amharic language. It is also a surname The prominent Ethiopians with the name Alemayehu are:

Given name
Prince Alemayehu (1861–1879), Ethiopian prince and son of Tewodros II
Alemayehu Bezabeh (born c. 1986), Ethiopian long-distance runner who competes for Spain
Alemayehu Eshete (born 1941), Ethio-jazz musician
Alemayehu Roba (born 1972), retired Ethiopian middle-distance runner
Alemayehu Shumye (born 1988), Ethiopian marathon runner
Alemayehu Tegenu, Minister of Mines and Energy of Ethiopia

Surname
Haddis Alemayehu (1910–2003), Ethiopian Foreign Minister and novelist
Simretu Alemayehu (born 1970), Ethiopian retired long-distance runner and winner of the Turin Marathon

Amharic-language names
Masculine given names